Bumdeling Gewog (Dzongkha: བུམ་སྡེ་གླིང་) (sometimes spelt Bomdeling) is a gewog (village block) of Trashiyangtse District, Bhutan.

References 

 https://web.archive.org/web/20100224040957/http://www.trashiyangtse.gov.bt/gewogDetail.php?id=4

 Gewogs of Bhutan
 Trashiyangtse District